Lucumí is a lexicon of words and short phrases derived from the Yoruba language and used for ritual purposes in Cuba and the Cuban Diaspora. It is used as the liturgical language of Santería in Cuba and other communities that practice Santería/Cuban Orisa/the Lucumí religion/Regla de Ocha.

The Yorùbá language has not been a vernacular among Yoruba descendants in the Americas since the time of the trans-Atlantic slave trade; devotees of the Orisa religion as it formed in the Spanish Caribbean use a liturgical language that developed from its remains. Lucumí has also been influenced by the phonetics and pronunciation of Spanish.  The essential and non-negotiable tonal aspect of Yorùbá has also been lost in the Lucumí lexicon of Cuban Orisa tradition.
Scholars have found some minimal influence from Bantu languages and Fongbe, some of which were spoken by other enslaved Africans who lived in close proximity to Yorùbá speakers in the Americas.

See also
Diaspora language
Afro-Cubans
Santería
Habla Congo, a similar liturgical language based on Kongo
Haitian Vodoun Culture Language

References

Afro-Cuban culture
Languages of Cuba
Languages of the African diaspora
Sacred languages
Yoruba diaspora
Yoruba history
Yoruba language
Yoruboid languages